Justice Elliott may refer to:

Byron Elliott (1835–1913), associate justice of the Indiana Supreme Court
Charles B. Elliott (1861–1935), associate justice of the Minnesota Supreme Court
Jehu Elliott (1813–1876), associate justice of the Indiana Supreme Court
Victor A. Elliott (1839–1899), associate justice of the Colorado Supreme Court

See also
Judge Elliott (disambiguation)
Justice Ellett (disambiguation)